Murray Warmath was the head football coach at the University of Minnesota for 18 seasons from 1954 to 1971.  The team had an 87-78-7 overall record.  In the Big Ten they went  65-57-4 record and won two conference titles.  The 1960 team claimed the national title, the most recent for the Golden Gophers.  Eleven players were awarded All-American status.  Two of Minnesota's five Chicago Tribune Silver Football awards were given under Warmath.  Twenty-six players were named All-Big Ten first team.  Eighteen players were named All-Big Ten second team.  Five players were named Academic All-Americans.  Thirty-one players were named Academic All-Big Ten.

1954

1955

1956

1957

1958

1959

1960

1961

1962

1963

1964

1965

1966

1967

1968

1969

1970

1971

References

Minnesota Golden Gophers football seasons